Thea Helene Gammelgaard Sørbo (born 28 March 2003) is a Norwegian footballer who plays for the Swedish club Hammarby and the Norway national team.

Career 
She played youth and junior football in Nesodden and Lyn, before going to Kolbotn before the 2020 season.

In January 2023, she signed for the Swedish club Hammarby.

Sørbo played international matches for the U15, U16, U17, U19, and the U23 national teams of Norway.  She was part of the Norwegian U19 national team that took silver in the 2022 Under-19 European Championship.  In November 2022, she was selected for the senior Norwegian national team for the first time.

External links 

 Thea Sørbo – Norwegian Football Association 
 Thea Sørbo – Soccerdonna
 Thea Sørbo - FBref

References 

Norwegian women's footballers
Association football defenders
Women's association football defenders
2003 births
Hammarby Fotboll players
Kolbotn Fotball players
Norway international footballers
Norway women's youth international footballers
Living people